The 2017 FIS Freestyle Ski and Snowboarding World Championships were held in Sierra Nevada, Spain, from March 6–19, 2017.

Snowboard cross team events for men and women were introduced to the championships schedule for the first time, bringing the total number of events contested to 26.

Schedule

Medalists

Freestyle skiing

Men's events

Women's events

Snowboarding

Men's events

Women's events

Medal table

External links
Sierra Nevada 2017 

 
2017
2017 in freestyle skiing
2017
2017 in snowboarding
2017 in Spanish sport
International winter sports competitions hosted in Spain
Sierra Nevada (Spain)
March 2017 sports events in Spain
2017 in Andalusia